Lombroso, Lumbroso, or Lumbrozo is a surname, derived from a Sephardi family, members of which lived in Tunis, Marseilles, and Italy. The surname may refer to:

 Isaac Lumbroso (1680–1752), rabbi and talmudist
 Cesare Lombroso (1835–1909), Italian criminologist
 Jacob Lumbrozo, Portuguese traveller, first Jew to permanently settle in the American British colonies.
 Lombroso (band), an Italian indie band, featuring Taketo Gohara

See also
 Casal Lumbroso, an administrative subdivision of Rome
 Mocatta, also known as Lumbrozo de Mattos Mocatta or Lumbroso de Mattos Mocatta, a distinguished ancient Anglo-Jewish family

Jewish surnames
Sephardic surnames